This article details the fixtures and results of the UAE national football team in 1975. 

The national team was represented at the 1975 Palestine Cup for the 2nd time, but they failed to get through the group stages suffering two defeats without scoring any goals.

Schedule

1975 Palestine Cup

1975 Palestine Cup

National team
National team
1975
United